Younique  is an American multi-level marketing (MLM) company that markets beauty products.

It may also refer to:

Younique (album), by the German band Superior
Younique Unit, SM Entertainment artists
 PYL Younique Volume 1, a 2012 Korean singles album

See also
Unique (disambiguation)
Uniq (disambiguation)